Salvatore Accardo (Knight Grand Cross born 26 September 1941 in Turin, northern Italy) is an Italian violinist and conductor, who is known for his interpretations of the works of Niccolò Paganini.

Accardo owns one Stradivarius violin, the "Hart ex Francescatti" (1727) and had the "Firebird ex Saint-Exupéry" (1718).

Biography
Accardo studied violin in the southern Italian city of Naples in the 1950s. He gave his first professional recital at the age of 13 performing Paganini's Capricci. In 1958 Accardo became the first prize winner of the Paganini Competition in Genoa.

In the 1970s he was a leader of the celebrated Italian chamber orchestra "I Musici" (1972-1977).

After he was a student in Accademia Musicale Chigiana in Siena, he taught there from 1973 to 1980.

Accardo founded the Accardo Quartet in 1992 and he was one of the founders of the Walter Stauffer Academy in 1986.

He founded the Settimane Musicali Internazionali in Naples and the Cremona String Festival in 1971, and in 1996, he re-founded the Orchestra da Camera Italiana (O.C.I.), whose members are the best pupils of the Walter Stauffer Academy. The most famous pupils are Alessio Bidoli, Franco Mezzena and Anastasiya Petryshak.

He performed the music of Paganini for the soundtrack of the 1989 film Kinski Paganini.

In 2004, he came back to Siena, and now he teaches in Accademia Musicale Chigiana.

Honours 
 :  Grande Ufficiale dell'Ordine al merito della Repubblica italiana (June 1965)
  : Cavaliere di Gran Croce dell'Ordine al merito della Repubblica italiana (Oct 1982)
 : Commander of the Order of Cultural Merit (November 1999)

Discography
He has recorded Paganini's 24 Caprices (re-recorded in 1999) for solo violin and was the first violinist to record all six of the violin concerti by Paganini. He has an extensive discography of almost 50 recordings on Philips, DG, EMI, Sony Classical, Foné, Dynamic, and Warner-Fonit. He recorded Rossini String Sonatas, a cherished 1981 issue 6769 024, and an album of classical and contemporary works in 1995 on Paganini's Guarneri del Gesù 1742 violin, Il Cannone. He also recorded with the pianist Bruno Canino the complete sonatas for violin and piano of Mozart.

 Diabolus in Musica, Accardo interpreta Paganini 1996

References

External links 
 
 Additional biographical information
 Discography at SonyBMG Masterworks
 Salvatore Accardo - Accademia Musicale Chigiana

1941 births
Living people
Italian classical violinists
Male classical violinists
Italian male conductors (music)
Musicians from Turin
Honorary Members of the Royal Academy of Music
Paganini Competition prize-winners
People from Torre del Greco
Commanders of the Order of Cultural Merit (Monaco)
21st-century Italian conductors (music)
21st-century Italian male musicians
21st-century classical violinists
20th-century Italian conductors (music)
20th-century Italian male musicians
20th-century classical violinists
Knights Grand Cross of the Order of Merit of the Italian Republic